Beamery is a privately-held global human capital management software as a service company. It is headquartered in London, United Kingdom, and operates in Germany, Singapore and the United States. Their main product is an AI-powered talent platform meant to assist other organizations in managing employees.

History 

Beamery was founded as a “garage project” by Abakar Saidov and his brother, Sultan Saidov, along with Mike Paterson, in London in 2013. Their vision for Beamery had its origins in their experiences as children of immigrants, when they became aware of the structural challenges associated with work.

In 2016, Beamery raised $2 million in a seed round from Edenred Capital Partners and Grupa Pracuj, a human resources tech firm. They went on to raise a further $5 million in a Series A funding round in 2017, led by Index Ventures and continued in 2018 to raise $28m in Series B funding in a round led by EQT Ventures.

Beamery's Series C funding took place in 2021, when Beamery raised $138 million. The Ontario Teachers' Pension Plan Board (Ontario Teachers’), a prolific tech investor, led the round by way of its Teachers’ Innovation Platform (TIP). Other participants included several strategic backers who are also using Beamery: Accenture Ventures, EQT Ventures, Index Ventures, M12 (venture capital) (Microsoft’s venture arm) and Workday Ventures.

In 2022 Beamery reached a valuation of $1bn and became a “unicorn”, after a Series D funding round raising $50m. The funding round was led by Teachers’ Ventures Growth (TVG), part of the C$242 billion Ontario Teachers' Pension Plan, adding to its Series C investment in June 2021.

In January 2023, Beamery announced it would be laying off approximately 12% of its workforce, citing inflation and energy crises, high interest rates and "sparser startup funding".

Awards and recognition 
 2022 "Best Recruitment Technology" from the National Online Recruitment Awards
 2022 "Tech Cares Award" from Trust Radius
 2022 "100 of the fastest-growing companies to accelerate your career"
 2022/2021 "50 Fastest Growing Companies in the UK"
 2020 "top 50 leading late-stage tech companies in the UK" 
 2018 "LinkedIn’s Top 25 Startups To Work For"

References

Recruitment
Recruitment software
Customer relationship management software companies
As a service
Multinational companies